Siret Räämet (born 31 December 1999) is an Estonian footballer who plays as a defender and has appeared for the Estonia women's national team.

Career
Räämet has been capped for the Estonia national team, appearing for the team during the UEFA Women's Euro 2021 qualifying cycle.

References

External links
 
 
 
 

1999 births
Living people
Footballers from Tallinn
Estonian women's footballers
Estonia women's international footballers
Women's association football defenders
FC Flora (women) players